Chris the Swiss is a 2018 Swiss animated documentary film directed by Anja Kofmel. It was screened in the International Critics' Week section at the 2018 Cannes Film Festival.

Cast
 Susanne-Marie Wrage as German Narrator / Voice Anja 
 Megan Gay as English Narrator / Voice Anja 
 Joel Basman as Voice Chris 
 Domagoj Janković as Voice Flores 
 Marko Cindrić as Voice Julio 
 Barbara Durović as Voice Heidi 
 Dean Krivačić as Voice Alex 
 Damjan Simić as Voice Paul 
 Milton Welsh as Voice Frenchy 
 Eva Japundžić as Voice Kid 1 
 Grgur Japundžić as Voice Kid 2

Reception 
Stephen Dalton of The Hollywood Reporter said "Swiss director Anja Kofmel revisits the wild life and strange death of her war reporter cousin with an innovative blend of animation and documentary". Jessica Kiang from Variety praises the animation "Her animations are particularly lovely, evoking the hero worship she felt as a child for her larger-than-life relative — the boldly drawn continuous lines of black and white, solid and simple, in which Chris forever wears an identifying stripy scarf, and the bad guys, like Chico with his dark-ringed eyes and widow’s peak, have the decency to look like villains."

References

External links
 
Chris the Swiss on DSCHOINT VENTSCHR
Chris the Swiss on SWISS FILMS

2018 films
2018 documentary films
2010s German-language films
Swiss documentary films
Yugoslav Wars in fiction